Moussa Saib Koné (born 12 February 1990) is an Ivorian footballer who plays as a midfielder for FC Kyzylzhar.

Career

Early career
Born in Anyama, Ivory Coast, Koné began to play football on his native country as a child, and impressed Italian clubs, like Inter, but signed with Atalanta, to play in the club youth categories.

Foggia (loan)
On 28 July 2010, Koné was loaned to Foggia for a season-long, to gain first-team experience. He made his debut for the club on 22 August, against Cavese. He made his first professional goal in the next round on 29 August, against Lucchese. At the end of the season, Koné made 32 appearances and scored 4 goals for Foggia.

Pescara (loan)
On 19 August 2011, Koné was loaned again, this time to Serie B club Pescara. He made his debut on 26 August 2011 coming off the bench to replace Marco Verratti in the 45th minute. On 1 November, he score his first goal for Pescara, against Varese.

Varese (loan)
On 30 August 2012, Koné made his third loan spell, to Serie B club Varese, as a loan exchange for Giuseppe De Luca. He made his debut on 1 September, against Virtus Lanciano, also getting on the scoresheet.

Cesena
On 10 July 2015 Koné and Federico Varano were signed by A.C. Cesena in definitive deals, with Luca Valzania moved to opposite direction.

International career
Koné was called up to Ivory Coast national football team for a friendly match against Israel on 10 August 2011 and made his Les Éléphants debut coming off the bench to replace Yaya Touré in the 46th minute. 22 minutes later, he scored his first international goal.

Koné also played in 2011 CAF U-23 Championship, starting in Ivory Coast all matches, and scoring against Egypt.

International goals

|-
| 1. || 10 August 2011 || Stade de Genève, Geneva, Switzerland ||  || 3–0 || 4–3 || Friendly
|}

Honours

Club
Pescara
Serie B: 2011–12

References

External links

1990 births
Living people
Ivorian footballers
Ivory Coast international footballers
Ivorian expatriate footballers
Expatriate footballers in Italy
Atalanta B.C. players
Calcio Foggia 1920 players
Delfino Pescara 1936 players
S.S.D. Varese Calcio players
U.S. Avellino 1912 players
A.C. Cesena players
Frosinone Calcio players
Serie A players
Serie B players
Association football midfielders
2011 CAF U-23 Championship players
Footballers from Abidjan